Faton Xhemaili (born 15 November 1998) is a Serbian-born Albanian football defender who plays for German club FC Pipinsried.

Club career
Born in Biljača, part of Bujanovac Municipality, located within Preševo Valley, a region in Serbia with Albanian majority. Xhemaili started playing in the youth team of FK Veliki Trnovac from where he moved to Germany in summer 2016 to play in the youth side of TSV Schott Mainz in the season 2016–17.

In summer 2017 he returned to Serbian and joined the youth team of FK Radnik Surdulica. Being a newly promoted club to the Serbian SuperLiga, Radnik was looking for ways to challenge the vast majority of clubs in the league which were already established clubs at Serbian top-level. One way the club from Surdulica tried to diminish the gap was by recruiting talented Albanian players originally from the neighbouring Preševo valley and Kosovo. Among them, the highlights go to Ilaz Zylfiu from Miratovac who was playing at local side Murina, and the other was Xhemaili, whose regular performances in the youth team of semi-professional German side TSV Schott Mainz gave a positive indication about his future potential and quality.

However, during the preparations for the second-half of the season in winter 2017, it became clear both Xhemaili and Zylfiu would be in the group of youngsters needing more experience, and were selected to be placed at loan for the next period. For Xhemaili this meant being sent on loan to FK Budućnost Popovac in the Serbian third tier for the next 6-months. During this time, both Football Association of Albania and Albanian clubs turned their focus on footballers from abroad which were either Albanian or had Albanian background. Upon returning from the loan in summer 2018, Xhemaili stayed with the first-team playing with them the first-half of the 2018–19 Serbian SuperLiga, however, he received very few opportunities, being 11 times on the bench but making only one league appearance, and one in the Serbian Cup. This is when in the winter-break of that season, Radnik Surdulica accepts an offer from Albanian Superliga side FK Kukësi, a move that proved to be good for the player as he made seven appearances in the same half-season time as let-defender. He finished the season in second place in the 2018–19 Albanian Superliga, and also won his first trophy, the 2018–19 Albanian Cup.

International career
In November 2018, Albania U-21 national team coach Alban Bushi, called the attention of the Albanian media to Xhemaili as a perspective left-winger playing in Serbian top-flight, and as a prospect of the Albania national team. He made his debut a day after his 20th birthday in a friendly game against Malta by entering as substitute in 76th minute of the game, which ended as a 2:0 Albanian win.

Honors
Kukësi
 Albanian Cup: 2018–19

References

1998 births
Living people
People from Bujanovac
Albanians in Serbia
Association football defenders
Serbian footballers
Albanian footballers
Albania under-21 international footballers
FK Radnik Surdulica players
FK Kukësi players
KF Skënderbeu Korçë players
FC Pipinsried players
Serbian SuperLiga players
Kategoria Superiore players
Regionalliga players
Albanian expatriate footballers
Expatriate footballers in Germany
Albanian expatriate sportspeople in Germany